The  is a breed of dog originating from Japan. Other names for the breed include Ainu-ken, Seta, Ainu dog, Hokkaidog. In Japan, its name is sometimes shortened to Dō-ken (道犬). The Hokkaido is native to the prefecture of the same name in Japan.

Appearance

The dog is medium in size, with small, triangular,black upright ears. The small black eyes have a rising triangular outline. The Hokkaido has a coat of long, stiff fur, and a second, shorter coat of soft fur. Colors include red, white, black, brindle, sesame, black and tan, and wolf-gray. Males are typically 50 cm (20 in) tall at the withers, females slightly shorter, with body masses in the 20 kg (44 lb) range. Dogs bred on continents outside of their native Japan may be smaller.

History
The Hokkaido dog is thought to have originated from the medium-sized dogs brought by immigrants from the main island of Honshu in the 1140s. In 1869, the English zoologist Thomas W. Blakiston gave the breed the name Hokkaido. The breed was useful in the search for survivors of an Imperial Japanese Army regiment that was caught in heavy snow crossing the Hakkōda Mountains of Aomori Prefecture in 1902.

In 1937, the Ainu dog was designated in Japan as "a rare species protected by law" by the Ministry of Education and it was decided that the official name of the breed would be Hokkaido-Inu. However, the dogs are almost always called Hokkaido-Ken among the Japanese people.

The breed is extremely rare outside its native country.

Health
The Hokkaido dog has a very high rate of Collie eye anomaly (CEA). About 1/3 of Hokkaidos are affected by CEA while 2/3 are carriers.

References

External links

 Hokkaido Dog Photos
 Hokkaido Association of North America
 Hokkaido Breed information website (including CEA info)

Ainu culture
Breeds originating from Indigenous people
Dog breeds originating in Japan
Mammals of Japan
Rare dog breeds
Spitz breeds